Cinelli is an Italian bicycle manufacturing company based in Milan, producing mostly road bicycles and components; production is estimated to consist of 80 per cent components and 20 per cent bicycles.

History 

Cinelli was founded in 1948 by Cino Cinelli (born Montespertoli, 9 February 1916, died 20 April 2001), a former professional road racer and president of the Italian Cyclists' Association. He was a professional racer from 1937 to 1944, winning Milan–San Remo in 1943, the Giro di Lombardia in 1938, and the Tour of the Apennines in 1937.  He started a company under his name in 1948.

Cinelli was the seventh of 10 children, the son of a small landowner near Florence. He became interested in bicycle technology after mechanical failures in races. Failure to interest manufacturers with his ideas in 1946 led him to start his own company. His brother Giotto was making steel stems and bars in Florence and Cinelli moved the business to Milan, centre of the Italian cycling industry. He made stems, bars and frames but depended on wholesaling for other companies. By his retirement, Cinelli's own goods were half the business. Stems and bars were 80 per cent of Cinelli's own sales.

Cinelli moved to alloy production in 1963, later than other manufacturers because he was concerned about strength. Annual production of alloy stems and bars rose from 5,000 in the 1950s, to 7,500 in the early 1960s. By 1978 the figure was 150,000. He made no more than 700 frames a year. In 1974, he designed an aerodynamic bike on which Ole Ritter broke his own hour record. The staple product was the Speciale Corsa road model made from 1947. The Speciale Corsa also became known as the "Super Corsa" after a supplier sent decals that erroneously said "Super Corsa" instead of "Speciale Corsa."

Cinelli recently teamed up with San Francisco-based MashSF to create the popular "Cinelli MASH" frames, which are widely used in the fixed-gear culture.

Trade mark 

The Cinelli (MILANO) head badge was originally cloisonne (fired glass on brass) and 55mm tall. Shortly thereafter (c.1953) it was hand-painted with enamel and 56mm tall. In approximately 1958 it was reduced in height to 51mm. In 1978, it became a decal. The design featured a knight's helmet, inspired by a family heirloom, with a red lily -   symbol of Florence - and a green serpent, symbol of Milan.

Company ownership 
The presidency of the company passed to Antonio Colombo, owner of Columbus tubing, in 1978.  In 1997 Cinelli became a division of Gruppo S.R.L.  In August 2021 Asobi Ventures bought Cinelli's parent company Gruppo S.R.L. for a non-public price.

Innovative products 

 Binda toe-straps (acquired by Cinelli - 1958)
 Integral sloping fork crown (1950?)
 Unicanitor saddle (1962 - from acquisition of Unica) - The first plastic-bodied saddle
 Bivalent Hub (1960?) - After removal the freewheel stays attached to the frame; front and rear wheels are therefore interchangeable
 M71 Pedal (1971) - The first quick-release pedal (ref. 1971 Cinelli Catalog)
 Cinelli Model 1R stem with hidden clamp bolt (1971, ref Catalog M71, above)
 Laser (1980) - Track pursuit and time trial model which pioneered TiG welding in bicycle frames
 Rampichino (1985) - The first mountain bike in Italy
 Cork Ribbon (1987) - Handlebar tape

See also

 List of bicycle parts
 List of Italian companies

References

External links 

The Cinelli corporation
Cinelli USA
The Quiet Warrior: Cino Cinelli and the History of Innovation

Cycle manufacturers of Italy
Mountain bike manufacturers
Electric bicycles
Manufacturing companies based in Milan
Vehicle manufacturing companies established in 1948
Italian companies established in 1948
Italian brands